Sean Finning (born 22 January 1985) is an Australian cyclist. He competed at the 2006 Commonwealth Games where he won a gold medal. He was selected to represent Australia at the 2012 Summer Paralympics in cycling as a sighted pilot.

Personal
Finning was born on 22 January 1985 in Kyneton, Victoria.  He attended Castlemaine Secondary College, leaving school after year 11. , he lives in Castlemaine, Victoria and works for PJ's Discount Tyres.

Cycling

Finning is a cyclist. He is a member of the Castlemaine CC.

Finning competed at the 2006 Commonwealth Games where he won a gold medal. In 2010, he was the sighted pilot for Bryce Lindores at the Segovia Para-cycling World Cup where he earned a gold medal. He competed solo at the 2012 Bendigo International Madison. He was selected to represent Australia at the 2012 Summer Paralympics in cycling as a sighted pilot for Bryce Lindores.

References

Paralympic cyclists of Australia
Cyclists at the 2012 Summer Paralympics
Cyclists from Victoria (Australia)
1985 births
Living people
Paralympic silver medalists for Australia
Commonwealth Games medallists in cycling
Commonwealth Games gold medallists for Australia
Australian male cyclists
Cyclists at the 2006 Commonwealth Games
Medalists at the 2012 Summer Paralympics
Paralympic medalists in cycling
People from Kyneton
Medallists at the 2006 Commonwealth Games